Okavango Delta region is one of the subdistricts of Ngamiland District of Botswana.

Villages 

Daonara
Ditshiping
Jao
Katamaga
Morutsha
Xaxaba

Localities 

3rd Bridge
Abu Camp
Baine's Camp
Boat Camp
Botswana Elephant Training C
Camp Moremi
Camp Okavango
Camp Okuti
Chiefs Camp
Chitabe/Chitabe Trials
Delta Camp
Dibatana Camp
Duba Plains Camp
Eagle Island Camp
Eden Camp
Fly-Kujwane Camp
Footsteps Camp
Gadingwe 2 Camp
Gomoti Camp
Gubenare Camp
Guma Camp
Gunn's Camp
Ivory Camp
Ivory Fly Camp
Jacana Camp
Jao Camp
Kanana Camp
Kaporota Camp
Kiri Camp
Kubu Camp
Kubu Fly Camp
Kujwana Lediba
Kujwane Camp
Kwara Camp
Kwetsane Camp
Lion Research Camp
Little Kwara Camp
Little Vumbura Camp
Livingstone Camp
Macatee Camp
Macatoo Camp
Makwena Camp
Mantis Camp
Matsibe
Mmapula Lodge
Mombo Camp
Moremi Safaris
Motswiri Camp
Nxabega Camp
Oddballs Camp
Pompom Research Camp
Pompon Camp
Qomoqao
Qorokwe Camp
Ranns Camp
Sandibe Camp
Santantadibe Camp
Selby's Camp
Semetsi and Bush Camp
Seokgwe BDF Camp
Shindi Camp
Stanley's Camp
Thabazimbi
Thapagadi Camp
Tubutree Camp
Vumbura Camp
Vundumxiki Camp
Water Affairs Camp
Wildlife Camp
Xakanaka Wildlife Camp
Xigera Camp
Xudum Camp
Xugana Camp

References 

North-West District (Botswana)
Populated places in Botswana